The 2010 Claxton Shield finals series made use of the same structure as had been used in the 2009 season. The top three teams at the conclusion of the ten rounds of regular season games qualified. The second and third placed teams faced in each other in a best of three series hosted by the second placed team. The winner of that series then faced the first placed team for a best of three series. South Australia hosted the New South Wales Patriots at Norwood Oval, Adelaide for the semi-final series, while the Victoria Aces hosted the championship series at La Trobe University, Melbourne.

In the finals, the home team and away team alternated during each of the series. As a result, South Australia was officially the away team for game two of its series against New South Wales, as was Victoria in game two of the championship series.

South Australia came from behind in the semi-final series to win 2–1. New South Wales won game one 1–0 on the back of Timothy Auty's RBI-double, as well as Timothy Cox and Lee Ingram combining for a four-hit shutout. Despite being outhit 10–6, South Australia won game two 3–2. Unusually, the winning run was scored in the top of the ninth inning without a safe hit being recorded. Game three was won by South Australia 1–0, largely through the man of the match performance of Ryan Murphy; he pitched a complete game shutout, and scored the only run of the game on a solo home run to right field.

Despite splitting their regular season games 3–3, Victoria swept South Australia in the championship series 2–0. Despite taking an early lead in game one, South Australia was unable to hold on after allowing six runners to reach base resulting in three runs scoring in the fourth inning. Victoria held its 5–3 lead for the rest of the game through the pitching of Russell Spear and finals MVP Matthew Blackmore. In game two, South Australia led for much of the game, but a costly error by Ben Wigmore in the sixth inning, hits from Andrew Russell, Paul Weichard, James Beresford and Matthew Lawman in the ninth, and a run-free pitching performance from Ross Hipke and Russell Spear in the final three innings allowed Victoria to come from behind two nights in a row to win 7–4, and claim the states' 22nd Claxton Shield title.

Bracket

Semi-final series

Game 1 
The finals series started off with a pitcher's duel: both teams were held scoreless through the first six innings, with both New South Wales' Timothy Cox and South Australia's Paul Mildren holding their opposition to only three hits in that time. But in the seventh, Patrick Maat led off the inning for the Patriots with a base hit to centre field. He then advanced to second base on Andrew Graham's sacrifice bunt, and scored on Timothy Auty's double. Cox pitched 8 innings, giving up 4 hits, 3 walks, and striking out 9 batters to pick up the win. Lee Ingram came into the game for the ninth inning to close the game, picking up a strike out while retiring three hitters in a row to get the save.

Game 2 
In another tight contest, South Australia snapped a streak of eight losing efforts in a row in finals games to New South Wales, winning 3–2. South Australia opened the scoring in the top of the fifth. Ben Wigmore and Dan Wilson hit back–to–back singles, Mathew Smith grounded out to advance both. With two out, Jason Pospishil errored on Scott Gladstone's hit to second base, allowing both runners to score.

Pospshil helped the Patriots to recover immediately in the bottom of the inning, with a single to lead off the inning. He then scored on Mark Holland's double to cut the deficit in half. In the eighth inning, New South Wales evened the game, with David Kandilas's infield hit driving in Patrick Maat. In the ninth however, South Australia regained the lead without a hit: two walks and two hit by pitches allowed Stefan Welch to score.

Game 3 
Like the first two games of the semi-final series, the third and deciding game was also decided by one run. Ryan Murphy was named man of the match, after pitching a two–hit shutout, and hitting a solo home run in the second inning to score the only run in the game. Prior to the game, Murphy had not started on the mound in any game in the season, and had only pitched one and a third innings in one prior appearance. Michael Lysaught almost tied the game in the third inning with a solo home run of his own. Only Dan Wilson's catch from over the fence in right field prevented it.

Championship series

Game 1 
Baseball returned to La Trobe University for the Victoria Aces' home championship series, after having just the one game there during the regular season. Unlike the semi-final series, scoring started immediately in the championship series, with South Australia scoring in the top of the first inning: Jeremy Cresswell singled and then advanced to third when Stefan Welch reached on a throwing error by catcher Grant Karlsen. Michael Collins and Ryan Murphy each walked in consecutive plate appearances, advancing Cresswell to score the first run. Before the inning could be closed out, Welch scored on a wild pitch to extend South Australia's lead to two.

Brad Harman opened the scoring for Victoria in the second inning, with a first pitch solo home run to halve the deficit. Victoria tied the game up at 2–2 through back to back doubles in the third, first from Brett Tamburrino and followed by Andrew Russell to drive Tamburrino in. South Australia briefly regained the lead in the top of the fourth inning: Ben Wigmore lead off the inning with a walk, advanced to second on Mathew Smith's single, and scored on Scott Gladstone's double.

Gladstone's RBI-double was the final pitch for Adam Blackley, having scattered 4 hits over  innings pitched, striking out 7 and allowing 3 runs, only 1 of which was earned. He was replaced by Matthew Blackmore, who pitched into the ninth inning, allowing only 1 hit and striking out 4 over 5 innings pitched. Neither starting pitcher pitched beyond the fourth inning, as South Australia's Paul Mildren was also replaced after  innings, allowing 7 hits and 5 runs (4 earned), and striking out 3.

Victoria regained the lead permanently in the bottom of the fourth, and in the process drove Mildren from the game. James Beresford led off the inning with a walk, advanced to third on Matthew Lawman's double and scored on Elliott Biddle's single. Scott Wearne reached second on a throwing error by second baseman Smith, which also allowed Lawman to score. Tamburrino received a walk, followed by Russell being hit by a pitch which forced Biddle to score. The hit batter resulted in Chris Lawson replacing Mildren on the mound. Like the other relievers in the game, Lawson did not allow a run to score over his  innings pitched. The 5–3 score at the end of the fourth inning would be maintained for the rest of the game. Russell Spear entered the game in the ninth inning to close the game for Victoria, earning the save. Blackmore was credited with the win, while Mildren was charged with the loss for South Australia.

Game 2 
The second game of the series started in even fashion: both sides were retired in order in the first inning, and each got runners into scoring position without actually scoring in the second. The games' first run came in the third inning, and for the fourth time in the 2010 postseason a run was driven in by a walk. Tristan McDonald led off the inning with a single to center field. He advanced to second on Brett Tamburrino's single to right field, to third when Andrew Russell was hit by a pitch, then scored when Paul Weichard drew a walk. South Australia tied the score again in the fourth inning. Ben Wigmore walked to lead off the inning, and advanced to second when Dan Wilson ground out to first base. Wigmore then scored on Mathew Smith's single.

Victoria immediately regained the lead in the top of the fifth inning. Tamburrino singled, and then advanced to third on Russell's own base hit. Weichard hit a deep fly ball to center field, allowing Tamburrino to score on the sacrifice fly. However South Australia took the lead for the first time in the game in the bottom of the inning, when Shane Lindsay—pitching in relief of Adam Bright, who'd struck out 5 and allowed 5 hits, 1 walk and 1 run over 4 innings pitched—walked David Washington and Jeremy Cresswell, before giving up a home run to Michael Collins to take the score to 4–2. After the home run Lindsay, Ross Hipke and Russell Spear would combine to keep South Australia from scoring again in the game.

That lead was halved in the sixth through an unearned run. Elliot Biddle got on through an infield hit, and then advanced to third when Ben Wigmore dropped a fly ball in center field off the bat of Hayden Dingle. This allowed Tristan McDonald to drive Wigmore in on a sacrifice fly. Richard Bartlett entered the game to pitch for South Australia in the seventh inning, but was unable to hold on to the one-run lead he was given, allowing the tying run to score in the eighth when he walked McDonald and gave up an RBI-double to Scott Wearne.

James Beresford drove in the go-ahead run in the top of the ninth inning in the form of Paul Weichard after he and Andrew Russell hit back to back infield singles. Hayden Beard was brought in by South Australia to try to stop the flow of runs, but gave up a two run-double to Matthew Lawman to take Victoria to a 7–4 lead. Russell Spear entered the game for Victoria as closer for the second night in a row, and despite giving up two hits was able to keep South Australia scoreless to earn a second save.

References 

finals series